Czecho may refer to:

 Czecho No Republic, a Japanese pop band
 Czecho-Slovakia, an alternate name for Czechoslovakia

See also
 Czech Republic
 Czechoslovakia
 Czech (disambiguation)
 Czechy (disambiguation)
 Čechy (disambiguation)